The taxonomy of the Gastropoda as it was revised in 2005 by Philippe Bouchet and Jean-Pierre Rocroi is a system for the scientific classification of gastropod mollusks. (Gastropods are a taxonomic class of animals which consists of snails and slugs of every kind, from the land, from freshwater, and from saltwater.) The paper setting out this taxonomy was published in the journal Malacologia. The system encompasses both living and extinct groups, as well as some fossils whose classification as gastropods is uncertain.

The Bouchet & Rocroi system was the first complete gastropod taxonomy that primarily employed the concept of clades, and was derived from research on molecular phylogenetics; in this context a clade is a "natural grouping" of organisms based upon a statistical cluster analysis. In contrast, most of the previous overall taxonomic schemes for gastropods relied on morphological features to classify these animals, and used taxon ranks such as order, superorder and suborder, which are typical of classifications that are still inspired by Linnaean taxonomy.

In the Bouchet & Rocroi taxonomy, clades are used between the rank of class and the rank of superfamily. The clades are unranked. Bouchet and Rocroi use six main clades: Patellogastropoda, Vetigastropoda, Cocculiniformia, Neritimorpha, Caenogastropoda, and Heterobranchia. The first three of these major clades have no nesting clades within them: the taxonomy goes immediately to the superfamily level. Within the Caenogastropoda there is one extra clade. In contrast, within the Heterobranchia, for some of the nudibranch groups there are six separate clades above the level of superfamily, and in the case of most of the land snails, there are four clades above the level of superfamily.
 
In some parts of the taxonomy, instead of "clade", Bouchet and Rocroi labelled groupings of taxa as a "group" or an "informal group". A clade must by definition contain only one lineage, and it was considered to be the case that these "informal groups" may either contain more than one lineage, or only contain part of a lineage. Further research will eventually resolve these questions.  Since the publication of this taxonomic system in 2005, various proposals for changes have been published by other authors, for more information see changes in the taxonomy of gastropods since 2005.

In 2017 this taxonomy was superseded by a revised taxonomy "Revised Classification, Nomenclator and Typification of Gastropod and Monoplacophoran Families" by Philippe Bouchet & Jean-Pierre Rocroi, Bernhard Hausdorf, Andrzej Kaim, Yasunori Kano, Alexander Nützel, Pavel Parkhaev, Michael Schrödl and Ellen E. Strong in Malacologia, 2017, 61(1–2): 1–526. The authors have reverted to adopting the traditional ranks above superfamily: order, subclass, as this was preferred by many users.

Context
Systems of classification such as this one are primarily of value to malacologists (people who study mollusks) and other biologists. Biological classification schemes are not merely a convenience, they are an attempt to show the actual phylogeny (the evolutionary relatedness) within a group of organisms. Thus, a taxonomy such as this one can be seen as an attempt to elucidate part of the tree of life, a phylogenetic tree.

The Bouchet & Rocroi 2005 system of gastropod taxonomy was laid out in a book-length paper entitled "Classification and Nomenclator of Gastropod Families", which was published in the journal Malacologia and which was written in collaboration with J. Frýda, B. Hausdorf, W. Ponder, Á. Valdés and A. Warén. This system supersedes the system of Ponder and Lindberg from 1997. Subsequent revisions by other authors have been made since the publication of this paper.

The taxonomy set out by Bouchet & Rocroi is an attempt to get one step closer to representing this part of the evolutionary history of the phylum Mollusca. Bouchet & Rocroi's classification system is a hybrid of the pre-existing, more traditional Linnaean taxonomy along with some more recent far-reaching revisions which are based on molecular work and use clades as taxa, (see cladistics). In the past, the taxonomy of gastropods was largely based on the morphological characters of the taxa, such as the shell characteristics (including the protoconch) in shelled species, and the internal anatomy, including the structure of the radula and details of the reproductive system. Recent advances are based more on the molecular characteristics of the DNA and RNA. This shift in emphasis has meant that the newer taxa and their hierarchy are subject to debate, a debate that is not likely to be resolved soon.

This proposed classification has tried to integrate the results of recent molecular work by using unranked clades for taxa below the traditional rank of class (class Gastropoda) but above the rank of superfamily (replacing the ranks subclass, superorder, order, and suborder), while still using the traditional Linnaean ranks for superfamilies and all taxa below the rank of superfamily (i.e., family, subfamily, tribe, genus, subgenus, and species. The clades have been given names which are similar to, or in some cases the same as, traditional Linnaean names for taxa above the level of superfamily. Whenever monophyly (a single ancestry) has not yet been tested and confirmed, or where a traditional taxon of gastropods has already been discovered to be paraphyletic (that it excludes some of its descendants) the term "group" or "informal group" has been used. Both Linnaean taxa and clades are invalid if it turns out they are polyphyletic, in other words if they consist of more than one lineage.

In this taxonomy 611 valid families are recognized. Of these, 202 families are exclusively fossil, and this is indicated here with a dagger †. Superfamily names are standardized so that they all end in the suffix "-oidea", also commonly used for superorders and subclasses, replacing the "-acea" ending found especially in the older literature. Classification of families into subfamilies however is often not well resolved, and should be regarded as the best possible hypothesis.

The publication Bouchet & Rocroi (2005) also includes a nomenclator of about 2400 suprageneric taxa (taxa above the level of genus) of gastropods, from the subtribe to the superfamily. A full bibliographic reference is provided for each taxon, giving the name of the authority, the original publication, the date of that publication, the type genus for the taxon, its nomenclatural status, and its validity under the rules of the ICZN.

Since the publication of this taxonomic system in 2005, various changes have been published by other authors, for more information see changes in the taxonomy of gastropods since 2005.

Main clades, groups and informal groups 
Here the information is displayed in the form of a cladogram (an evolutionary tree of descent.) It is worth bearing in mind however that this taxonomy is provisional: many of the taxa are still only known as "groups" or "informal groups", and these are very likely to be changed as more information becomes available.

This cladogram is based on the following information. The list format used below makes clear which taxa are informal groups rather than clades:

 Paleozoic molluscs of uncertain systematic position
 Clade Patellogastropoda
 Clade Vetigastropoda
 Clade Cocculiniformia
 Clade Neritimorpha
Paleozoic Neritimorpha of uncertain systematic position
Clade †Cyrtoneritimorpha
Clade Cycloneritimorpha
 Clade Caenogastropoda
Caenogastropoda of uncertain systematic position
Informal group Architaenioglossa
Clade Sorbeoconcha
Clade Hypsogastropoda
Clade Littorinimorpha
Informal group Ptenoglossa
Clade Neogastropoda
Clade Heterobranchia
Informal group Lower Heterobranchia
Informal group Opisthobranchia
Clade Cephalaspidea
Clade Thecosomata
Clade Gymnosomata
Clade Aplysiomorpha
Group Acochlidiacea
Clade Sacoglossa
Group Cylindrobullida
Clade Umbraculida
Clade Nudipleura
Clade Pleurobranchomorpha
Clade Nudibranchia
Clade Euctenidiacea
Clade Dexiarchia
Clade Pseudoeuctenidiacea
Clade Cladobranchia
Clade Euarminida
Clade Dendronotida
Clade Aeolidida
Informal group Pulmonata
Informal group Basommatophora
Clade Eupulmonata
Clade Systellommatophora
Clade Stylommatophora
Clade Elasmognatha
Clade Orthurethra
Informal group Sigmurethra

Taxonomy 
In the following, more detailed list, indentation is used only for the ranks of superfamily and family. The clade names are not indented, but their hierarchy is indicated by the size of the font used. A clearer sense of the hierarchy of the clades can be drawn from the list immediately above this one.

Paleozoic molluscs of uncertain systematic position 
(Existing as fossils only)

Uncertain position (Gastropoda or Monoplacophora) 
 unassigned to superfamily
 † Khairkhaniidae
 † Ladamarekiidae
 † Metoptomatidae
 † Patelliconidae
 † Protoconchoididae
 Archinacelloidea
 † Archinacellidae
 † Archaeopragidae
 Pelagielloidea
 † Pelagiellidae
 † Aldanellidae
 Scenelloidea
 † Scenellidae
 † Coreospiridae
 † Igarkiellidae
 Yochelcionelloidea
 † Yochelcionellidae
 † Stenothecidae
 † Trenellidae

With isostrophically coiled shells of uncertain position (Gastropoda or Monoplacophora) 

 † Bucanellidae
 † Bucaniidae
 † Euphemitidae
 † Pterothecidae
 † Sinuitidae
 † Tremanotidae
 † Tropidodiscidae

With anisostrophically coiled shells of uncertain position (Gastropoda?) 
 Euomphaloidea
 † Euomphalidae
 † Helicotomidae
 † Lesueurillidae
 † Omphalocirridae
 † Omphalotrochidae
 Macluritoidea
 † Macluritidae

Basal taxa that are certainly Gastropoda
(existing as fossils only)
 unassigned to superfamily
 † Anomphalidae
 † Codonocheilidae
 † Crassimarginatidae
 † Holopeidae
 † Isospiridae
 † Opisthonematidae
 † Paraturbinidae
 † Planitrochidae
 † Pragoserpulinidae
 † Pseudophoridae
 † Raphistomatidae
 † Rhytidopilidae
 † Scoliostomatidae
 † Sinuopeidae
 Clisospiroidea
 † Clisospiridae
 † Onychochilidae
 Loxonematoidea
 † Loxonematidae
 † Palaeozygopleuridae
 Ophiletoidea
 † Ophiletidae
 Straparollinoidea
 † Straparollinidae
 Trochonematoidea
 † Trochonematidae
 † Lophospiridae

Clade Patellogastropoda 
Superfamily Patelloidea
Family Patellidae
Superfamily Nacelloidea
Family Nacellidae
Superfamily Lottioidea
Family Lottiidae
Family Acmaeidae
Family Lepetidae
Superfamily Neolepetopsoidea
Family Neolepetopsidae
 † Family Daminilidae
 † Family Lepetopsidae

Clade Vetigastropoda 
Not assigned to a superfamily:
Family Ataphridae
Family Pendromidae
 † Family Schizogoniidae
Superfamily †Amberleyoidea
 † Family Amberleyidae
 † Family Nododelphinulidae
Superfamily †Eotomarioidea
 † Family Eotomariidae
 † Family Gosseletinidae
 † Family Luciellidae
 † Family Phanerotrematidae
Superfamily Fissurelloidea
Family Fissurellidae
Superfamily Haliotoidea
Family Haliotidae
 † Family Temnotropidae
Superfamily Lepetelloidea
Family Lepetellidae 
Family Addisoniidae
Family Bathyphytophilidae
Family Caymanabyssiidae
Family Cocculinellidae
Family Osteopeltidae
Family Pseudococculinidae
Family Pyropeltidae
Superfamily Lepetodriloidea
Family Lepetodrilidae
Family Clypeosectidae
Family Sutilizonidae
Superfamily †Murchisonioidea
 † Family Murchisoniidae
 † Family Cheeneetnukiidae
 † Family Hormotomidae
Superfamily Neomphaloidea: subsequent research has placed this superfamily in its own clade, the Neomphalina, basal to the Vetigastropoda 
Family Neomphalidae
Family Melanodrymiidae
Family Peltospiridae
Superfamily Pleurotomarioidea
Family Pleurotomariidae
 † Family Catantostomatidae
 † Family Kittlidiscidae
 † Family Phymatopleuridae
 † Family Polytremariidae
 † Family Portlockiellidae
 † Family Rhaphischismatidae
 † Family Trochotomidae
 † Family Zygitidae
Superfamily †Porcellioidea
 † Family Porcelliidae
 † Family Cirridae
 † Family Discohelicidae
 † Family Pavlodiscidae
Superfamily Scissurelloidea
Family Scissurellidae
Family Anatomidae
Superfamily Seguenzioidea
Family Seguenziidae
Family Chilodontidae
 † Family Eucyclidae
 † Family Laubellidae
Superfamily Trochoidea
Family Trochidae
Family Calliostomatidae
 † Family Elasmonematidae
 † Family Eucochlidae
 † Family Microdomatidae
 † Family Proconulidae
Family Solariellidae
 † Family Tychobraheidae
 † Family Velainellidae
Superfamily Turbinoidea
Family Turbinidae
Family Liotiidae
Family Phasianellidae

Clade Cocculiniformia 
Superfamily Cocculinoidea
Family Cocculinidae
Family Bathysciadiidae

Clade Neritimorpha  (= Neritopsina)
Contains the Palaeozoic Neritomorpha of uncertain position and the clades Cyrtoneritimorpha and Cycloneritimorpha
Unassigned to superfamily 
 † Family Craspedostomatidae
 † Family Pragoscutulidae
Superfamily Nerrhenoidea
 † Family Nerrhenidae
Superfamily Oriostomatoidea
 † Family Oriostomatidae
 † Family Tubinidae
Superfamily Palaeotrochoidea
 † Family Palaeotrochidae
Superfamily Platyceratoidea
 † Family Platyceratidae

Clade Cyrtoneritimorpha 
 † Family Orthonychiidae
 † Family Vltaviellidae

Clade Cycloneritimorpha 
Superfamily Helicinoidea
Family Helicinidae
 † Family Dawsonellidae
 † Family Deaniridae
Family Neritiliidae
Family Proserpinellidae
Family Proserpinidae
Superfamily Hydrocenoidea
Family Hydrocenidae
Superfamily Neritoidea
Family Neritidae
Family Phenacolepadidae
 † Family Pileolidae
Superfamily Neritopsoidea
Family Neritopsidae
 † Family Cortinellidae
 † Family Delphinulopsidae
 † Family Plagiothyridae
 † Family Pseudorthonychiidae
Family Titiscaniidae
Superfamily Symmetrocapuloidea
 † Family Symmetrocapulidae

Clade Caenogastropoda 
Contains the Caenogastropoda of uncertain systematic position, the informal group Architaenioglossa and the clades Sorbeoconcha and Hypsogastropoda
Caenogastropoda of uncertain systematic position:
Family Lyocyclidae Thiele, 1925
 † Family Plicatusidae
 † Family Spanionematidae
 † Family Spirostylidae
Superfamily Abyssochrysoidea Tomlin, 1927
 Acanthonematidae Wenz, 1938 †
Superfamily Acteoninoidea
 † Family Acteoninidae
 † Family Anozygidae
 † Family Soleniscidae
Superfamily Dendropupoidea
 † Family Dendropupidae
 † Family Anthracopupidae
Superfamily Paleostyloidea
 † Family Palaeostylidae
 † Family Goniasmatidae
 † Family Pithodeidae
Superfamily Peruneloidea
 † Family Perunelidae
 † Family Chuchlinidae
 † Family Imoglobidae
 † Family Sphaerodomidae
Superfamily Pseudomelanioidea
 † Family Pseudomelaniidae
 † Family Trajanellidae
Superfamily Subulitoidea
 † Family Subulitidae
 † Family Ischnoptygmatidae
 grade Zygopleuroid group - see Changes since 2005
 † Family Zygopleuridae
 Family Abyssochrysidae
 † Family Polygyrinidae
 † Family Protorculidae
 Family Provannidae
 † Family Pseudozygopleuridae

Informal group Architaenioglossa 
Superfamily Ampullarioidea
Family Ampullariidae
 † Family Naricopsinidae
Superfamily Cyclophoroidea
Family Cyclophoridae
Family Aciculidae
Family Craspedopomatidae
Family Diplommatinidae
 † Family Ferussinidae
Family Maizaniidae
Family Megalomastomatidae
Family Neocyclotidae
Family Pupinidae
Superfamily Viviparoidea
Family Viviparidae
 † Family Pliopholygidae

Clade Sorbeoconcha 
Not allocated to superfamily
 † Family Acanthonematidae
 † Family Canterburyellidae
 † Family Prisciphoridae
Superfamily Cerithioidea
Family Cerithiidae
Family Batillariidae
 † Family Brachytrematidae
 † Family Cassiopidae
Family Dialidae
Family Diastomatidae
 † Family Eustomatidae
 † Family Ladinulidae
 † Family Lanascalidae
 Family Litiopidae
 † Family Maoraxidae
Family Melanopsidae
  † Family Metacerithiidae
Family Modulidae
Family Pachychilidae
Family Paludomidae
Family Planaxidae
Family Pleuroceridae
 † Family Popenellidae
Family Potamididae
 † Family Procerithiidae - If the genus Argyropeza is placed in the Procerithiidae, then this family is not all fossil.
 † Family Prostyliferidae
 † Family Propupaspiridae
Family Scaliolidae
Family Siliquariidae
 † Family Terebrellidae - not a valid name
Family Thiaridae
Family Turritellidae
Superfamily Campaniloidea
Family Campanilidae
Family Ampullinidae
Family Plesiotrochidae
 † Family Trypanaxidae

Clade Hypsogastropoda 
Contains the clades Littorinimorpha, Neogastropoda and the informal group Ptenoglossa.
Not allocated to a superfamily
 † Family Coelostylinidae
 † Family Maturifusidae
 † Family Pommerozygiidae
 † Family Settsassiidae

Clade Littorinimorpha 
Superfamily Calyptraeoidea
Family Calyptraeidae
Superfamily Capuloidea
Family Capulidae
Superfamily Cingulopsoidea
Family Cingulopsidae
Family Eatoniellidae
Family Rastodentidae
Superfamliy Cypraeoidea
Family Cypraeidae
Family Ovulidae
Superfamily Ficoidea
Family Ficidae
Superfamily Littorinoidea
Family Littorinidae
 † Family Bohaispiridae
Family Pickworthiidae
Family Pomatiidae
 † Family Purpurinidae
Family Skeneopsidae
 † Family Tripartellidae
Family Zerotulidae
Superfamily Naticoidea
Family Naticidae
Superfamily Pterotracheoidea
Family Pterotracheidae
Family Atlantidae
 † Family Bellerophinidae
Family Carinariidae
Superfamily Rissooidea
Family Rissoidae
Family Amnicolidae
Family Anabathridae
Family Assimineidae
Family Barleeiidae
Family Bithyniidae
Family Caecidae
Family Calopiidae
Family Cochliopidae
Family Elachisinidae
Family Emblandidae
Family Epigridae
Family Falsicingulidae
Family Helicostoidae
Family Hydrobiidae
Family Hydrococcidae
Family Iravadiidae
Family Lithoglyphidae
 † Family Mesocochliopidae
Family Moitessieriidae
 † Family Palaeorissoinidae
Family Pomatiopsidae
Family Stenothyridae
Family Tornidae
Family Truncatellidae
Superfamily Stromboidea
Family Strombidae
Family Aporrhaidae
 † Family Colombellinidae
 † Family Pugnellidae
Family Rostellariidae
Family Seraphsidae
Family Struthiolariidae
 † Family Thersiteidae
 † Family Tylostomatidae
Superfamily Tonnoidea
Family Tonnidae
Family Bursidae
Family Laubierinidae
Family Personidae
Family Pisanianuridae
Family Ranellidae
Family Cassidae
Superfamily Vanikoroidea
Family Vanikoridae
Family Haloceratidae
Family Hipponicidae
 † Family Omalaxidae
Superfamily Velutinoidea
Family Velutinidae
Family Triviidae
Superfamily Vermetoidea
Family Vermetidae
Superfamily Xenophoroidea
Family Xenophoridae
 † Family Lamelliphoridae

Informal group Ptenoglossa 
Superfamily Epitonioidea
Family Epitoniidae
Family Janthinidae
Family Nystiellidae
Superfamily Eulimoidea
Family Eulimidae
Family Aclididae
Superfamily Triphoroidea
Family Triphoridae
Family Cerithiopsidae
Family Newtoniellidae

Clade Neogastropoda 
Unassigned to a superfamily
 † Family Johnwyattiidae
 † Family Perissityidae
 † Family Sarganidae
 † Family Speightiidae
 † Family Taiomidae
 † Family Weeksiidae
Superfamily Buccinoidea
Family Buccinidae
Family Colubrariidae
Family Columbellidae
Family Fasciolariidae
Family Nassariidae
Family Melongenidae
Superfamily Muricoidea
Family Muricidae
Family Babyloniidae
Family Costellariidae
Family Cystiscidae
Family Harpidae
Family Marginellidae
Family Mitridae
 † Family Pholidotomidae
Family Pleioptygmatidae
Family Strepsiduridae
Family Turbinellidae
Family Volutidae
Family Volutomitridae
Superfamily Olivoidea
Family Olividae
Family Olivellidae
Superfamily Pseudolivoidea
Family Pseudolividae
Family Ptychatractidae
Superfamily Conoidea
Family Conidae
Family Clavatulidae
Family Drilliidae
Family Pseudomelatomidae
Family Strictispiridae
Family Terebridae
Family Turridae
Superfamily Cancellarioidea
Family Cancellariidae

Clade Heterobranchia 
Contains the informal groups Heterobranchia, Opisthobranchia and Pulmonata

Informal group "Lower Heterobranchia" (= Allogastropoda) 
Unassigned to a superfamily
 Family Cimidae
 † Family Dolomitellidae
 † Family Heterosubulitidae
 † Family Kuskokwimiidae
 † Family Misurinellidae
Family Orbitestellidae
Family Tjaernoeiidae
Family Xylodisculidae
Superfamily Acteonoidea
Family Acteonidae
 † Family Acteonellidae
Family Aplustridae
Family Bullinidae
 † Family Zardinellidae
Superfamily Architectonicoidea
Family Architectonicidae
 † Family Amphitomariidae
 † Family Cassianaxidae
Superfamily Glacidorboidea
Family Glacidorbidae
Superfamily Mathildoidea
Family Mathildidae
 † Family Ampezzanildidae
 † Family Anoptychiidae
 † Family Gordenellidae
 † Family Tofanellidae
 † Family Trachoecidae
Superfamily Nerineoidea
 † Family Nerineidae
 † Family Ceritellidae
 † Family Nerinellidae
Superfamily Omalogyroidea
Family Omalogyridae
 † Family Studraxidae
Superfamily Pyramidelloidea
Family Pyramidellidae
Family Amathinidae
 † Family Heteroneritidae
Family Murchisonellidae
Superfamily Ringiculoidea
Family Ringiculidae
Superfamily Rissoelloidea
Family Rissoellidae
Superfamily Streptacidoidea
 † Family Streptacididae
 † Family Cassianebalidae
Superfamily Valvatoidea
Family Valvatidae
Family Cornirostridae
Family Hyalogyrinidae
 † Family Provalvatidae

Informal group Opisthobranchia 
Contains the clades Cephalaspidea, Thecosomata, Gymnosomata, Aplysiomorpha, Sacoglossa, Umbraculida, Nudipleura and the groups Acochlidiacea and Cylindrobullida.

Clade Cephalaspidea 
Superfamily Bulloidea
Family Bullidae
Superfamily Diaphanoidea
Family Diaphanidae
Family Notodiaphanidae
Superfamily Haminoeoidea
Family Haminoeidae
Family Bullactidae
Family Smaragdinellidae
Superfamily Philinoidea
Family Philinidae
Family Aglajidae
Family Cylichnidae
Family Gastropteridae
Family Philinoglossidae
Family Plusculidae
Family Retusidae
Superfamily Runcinoidea
Family Runcinidae
Family Ilbiidae

Clade Thecosomata 
Superfamily Cavolinioidea
Family Cavoliniidae
Family Limacinidae
 † Family Sphaerocinidae
Superfamily Cymbulioidea
Family Cymbuliidae
Family Desmopteridae
Family Peraclidae

Clade Gymnosomata 
Superfamily Clionoidea
Family Clionidae
Family Cliopsidae
Family Notobranchaeidae
Family Pneumodermatidae
Superfamily Hydromyloidea
Family Hydromylidae
Family Laginiopsidae

Clade Aplysiomorpha (= Anaspidea) 
Superfamily Aplysioidea
Family Aplysiidae
Superfamily Akeroidea
Family Akeridae

Group Acochlidiacea 
Superfamily Acochlidioidea
Family Acochlidiidae
Superfamily Hedylopsoidea
Family Hedylopsidae
Family Ganitidae
Family Livorniellidae
Family Minicheviellidae
Family Parhedylidae
Family Tantulidae
Superfamily Palliohedyloidea
Family Palliohedylidae
Superfamily Strubellioidea
Family Strubelliidae
Family Pseudunelidae

Clade Sacoglossa

Subclade Oxynoacea 
Superfamily Oxynooidea
Family Oxynoidae
Family Juliidae
Family Volvatellidae

Subclade Placobranchacea 
Superfamily Placobranchoidea
Family Placobranchidae
Family Boselliidae
Family Platyhedylidae
Superfamily Limapontioidea
Family Limapontiidae
Family Caliphyllidae
Family Hermaeidae

Group Cylindrobullida 
Superfamily Cylindrobulloidea
Family Cylindrobullidae

Clade Umbraculida 
Superfamily Umbraculoidea
Family Umbraculidae
Family Tylodinidae

Clade Nudipleura

Subclade Pleurobranchomorpha 
Superfamily Pleurobranchoidea
Family Pleurobranchidae

Subclade Nudibranchia 
Contains the clades Euctinidiacea and Dexiarchia
Unassigned to superfamily
Family Rhodopidae

Clade Euctenidiacea (= Holohepatica) 
Contains the subclades Gnathodoridacea and Doridacea

Subclade Gnathodoridacea
Superfamily Bathydoridoidea
Family Bathydorididae

Subclade Doridacea
Superfamily Doridoidea
Family Dorididae
Family Actinocyclidae
Family Chromodorididae
Family Discodorididae
Superfamily Phyllidioidea
Family Phyllidiidae
Family Dendrodorididae
Family Mandeliidae
Superfamily Onchidoridoidea
Family Onchidorididae
Family Corambidae
Family Goniodorididae
Superfamily Polyceroidea (= Phanerobranchiata Non Suctoria)
Family Polyceridae
Family Aegiretidae - Aegiretidae is incorrect subsequent spelling of this family in Bouchet & Rocroi (2005). Correct is Aegiridae.
Family Gymnodorididae
Family Hexabranchidae
Family Okadaiidae

Clade Dexiarchia (= Actenidiacea) 
Contains the clades Pseudoeuctenidiacea and Cladobranchia

Clade Pseudoeuctenidiacea  ( = Doridoxida) 
Superfamily Doridoxoidea
Family Doridoxidae

Clade Cladobranchia ( = Cladohepatica) 
Contains the subclades Euarminida, Dendronotida and Aeolidida
Not assigned to a superfamily
Family Charcotiidae
Family Dironidae
Family Dotidae
Family Embletoniidae
Family Goniaeolididae
Family Heroidae
Family Madrellidae
Family Pinufiidae
Family Proctonotidae

Subclade Euarminida
Superfamily Arminoidea
Family Arminidae
Family Doridomorphidae

Subclade Dendronotida
Superfamily Tritonioidea
Family Tritoniidae
Family Aranucidae
Family Bornellidae
Family Dendronotidae
Family Hancockiidae
Family Lomanotidae
Family Phylliroidae
Family Scyllaeidae
Family Tethydidae

Subclade Aeolidida
Superfamily Flabellinoidea ( = Pleuroprocta)
Family Flabellinidae
Family Notaeolidiidae
Superfamily Fionoidea
Family Fionidae
Family Calmidae
Family Eubranchidae
Family Pseudovermidae
Family Tergipedidae
Superfamily Aeolidioidea
Family Aeolidiidae
Family Facelinidae
Family Glaucidae
Family Piseinotecidae

Informal Group Pulmonata 
Contains the informal group Basommatophora and the clade Eupulmonata

Informal Group Basommatophora 
Contains the clade Hygrophila 
Superfamily Amphiboloidea
Family Amphibolidae
Superfamily Siphonarioidea
Family Siphonariidae
 † Family Acroreiidae

Clade Hygrophila 
Superfamily Chilinoidea
Family Chilinidae
Family Latiidae
Superfamily Acroloxoidea
Family Acroloxidae
Superfamily Lymnaeoidea
Family Lymnaeidae
Superfamily Planorboidea
Family Planorbidae
Family Physidae

Clade Eupulmonata 
Contains the clades Systellommatophora and Stylommatophora
Superfamily Trimusculoidea
Family Trimusculidae
Superfamily Otinoidea
Family Otinidae
Family Smeagolidae
Superfamily Ellobioidea
Family Ellobiidae

Clade Systellommatophora (= Gymnomorpha) 
Superfamily Onchidioidea
Family Onchidiidae
Superfamily Veronicelloidea
Family Veronicellidae
Family Rathouisiidae

Clade Stylommatophora 
Contains the subclades Elasmognatha, Orthurethra and the informal group Sigmurethra

Subclade Elasmognatha 
Superfamily Succineoidea
Family Succineidae
Superfamily Athoracophoroidea
Family Athoracophoridae

Subclade Orthurethra 
Superfamily Partuloidea
Family Partulidae
Family Draparnaudiidae
Superfamily Achatinelloidea
Family Achatinellidae
Superfamily Cochlicopoidea
Family Cochlicopidae
Family Amastridae
Superfamily Pupilloidea
Family Pupillidae
Family Argnidae
Family Chondrinidae
 † Family Cylindrellinidae
Family Lauriidae
Family Orculidae
Family Pleurodiscidae
Family Pyramidulidae
Family Spelaeoconchidae
Family Spelaeodiscidae
Family Strobilopsidae
Family Valloniidae
Family Vertiginidae
Superfamily Enoidea
Family Enidae
Family Cerastidae

Informal Group Sigmurethra 
Superfamily Clausilioidea
Family Clausiliidae
 † Family Anadromidae
 † Family Filholiidae
 † Family Palaeostoidae
Superfamily Orthalicoidea
Family Orthalicidae
Family Cerionidae
Family Coelociontidae
 † Family Grangerellidae
Family Megaspiridae
Family Placostylidae
Family Urocoptidae
Superfamily Achatinoidea
Family Achatinidae
Family Ferussaciidae
Family Micractaeonidae
Family Subulinidae
Superfamily Aillyoidea
Family Aillyidae
Superfamily Testacelloidea
Family Testacellidae
Family Oleacinidae
Family Spiraxidae
Superfamily Papillodermatoidea
Family Papillodermatidae
Superfamily Streptaxoidea
Family Streptaxidae
Superfamily  Rhytidoidea
Family Rhytididae
Family Chlamydephoridae
Family Haplotrematidae
Family Scolodontidae
Superfamily Acavoidea
Family Acavidae
Family Caryodidae
Family Dorcasiidae
Family Macrocyclidae
Family Megomphicidae
Family Strophocheilidae
Superfamily Plectopyloidea
Family Plectopylidae
Family Corillidae
Family Sculptariidae
Superfamily Punctoidea
Family Punctidae
 † Family Anastomopsidae
Family Charopidae
Family Cystopeltidae
Family Discidae
Family Endodontidae
Family Helicodiscidae
Family Oreohelicidae
Family Thyrophorellidae
Superfamily Sagdoidea
Family Sagdidae

limacoid clade 
Superfamily Staffordioidea
Family Staffordiidae
Superfamily Dyakioidea
Family Dyakiidae
Superfamily Gastrodontoidea
Family Gastrodontidae
Family Chronidae
Family Euconulidae
Family Oxychilidae
Family Pristilomatidae
Family Trochomorphidae
Fossil taxa that probably belong to the superfamily Gastrodontoidea:
Subfamily † Archaeozonitinae
Subfamily † Grandipatulinae
Subfamily † Palaeoxestininae
Superfamily Parmacelloidea
Family Parmacellidae
Family Milacidae
Family Trigonochlamydidae
Superfamily Zonitoidea
Family Zonitidae
Superfamily Helicarionoidea
Family Helicarionidae
Family Ariophantidae
Family Urocyclidae
Superfamily Limacoidea
Family Limacidae
Family Agriolimacidae
Family Boettgerillidae
Family Vitrinidae

Informal group Sigmurethra continued
Two other superfamilies are part of the clade Sigmurethra, but they are not in the limacoid clade:
Superfamily Arionoidea
Family Arionidae
Family Anadenidae
Family Ariolimacidae
Family Binneyidae
Family Oopeltidae
Family Philomycidae
Superfamily Helicoidea
Family Helicidae
Family Bradybaenidae
Family Camaenidae
Family Cepolidae
Family Cochlicellidae
Family Elonidae
Family Epiphragmophoridae
Family Halolimnohelicidae
Family Helicodontidae
Family Helminthoglyptidae
Family Humboldtianidae
Family Hygromiidae
Family Monadeniidae
Family Pleurodontidae
Family Polygyridae
Family Sphincterochilidae
Family Thysanophoridae
Family Trissexodontidae
Family Xanthonychidae

See also 
 Changes in the taxonomy of gastropods since 2005

References

External links

 Full text of Malacologia vol. 47 (1-2)

Gastropod taxonomy
Systems of animal taxonomy
Malacological literature